The Connecticut Grand Opera and Orchestra  was a non-profit, professional opera company and orchestra founded under that name in 1993 and based in Stamford, Connecticut in the United States. By uniting several organizations including the then-Connecticut Grand Opera in Bridgeport, CT and the Stamford Chamber Orchestra under the general director and conductor Laurence Gilgore, the opera company and orchestra came together as one organization.  The amalgamated company is often referred to as CGO&O.

CGO&O is a member of OPERA America and has received critical praise from The New York Times,   London's The Financial Times, Opera News, Opera magazine,  and The New Yorker.

The company presents three fully staged operas each year. In August 1985, under General Manager John Hiddlestone, it became the third American opera company ever to have been invited to perform at the Edinburgh International Festival with Menotti's The Consul.

Past productions having featured artists such as Marilyn Horne, Sherrill Milnes,  Alessandra Marc, Peter Serkin, and Renée Fleming, as well as directors Arvin Brown and Tom O'Horgan.

According to Form 990 Tax forms, they terminated their non-profit activities in 2012

See also
Connecticut Lyric Opera

References
Notes

External links
 Leith Theatre: Edinburgh International Festival
The range of productions presented from 1994 to 2008 on OPERA America's website  Retrieved 29 January 2012
 Biography of CGO&O conductor Laurence Gilgore on laurencegilgore.com  Retrieved 29 January 2012

American opera companies
Music of Connecticut
Culture of Stamford, Connecticut
1993 establishments in Connecticut
Musical groups established in 1993
Performing arts in Connecticut